Prince Mohammed bin Salman bin Abdulaziz Foundation (the MiSK Foundation) is a non-profit foundation established by Saudi crown prince Mohammad bin Salman in 2011.

History 
Created in 2011, the MiSK foundation was initiated by Mohammad bin Salman, then advisor to the Governor of Riyadh. The name of the Foundation comes from "misk" ("musk" in English); the perfume is a symbol of generosity and benevolence. The Foundation's work is focused on education, culture and media.

The MiSK Foundation launched the Tweeps Forum in 2013, an annual networking event connecting the Saudi youth with social media leaders, gathering speakers such as Abdullah bin Zayed Al Nahyan and Ivanka Trump.

In October 2015, the MiSK Foundation was one of the main partners of the 9th UNESCO Youth Forum in Paris. In September 2016, the two organisations signed a Framework Agreement to collaborate on the development of youth, education, emerging technologies, culture, and science. The 7th International Forum of NGOs was held in Riyadh in May 2017 in partnership with the MiSK foundation.

In 2017, the Foundation became a "member company" of the MIT Media Lab consortium.

The MiSK Art Institute, launched in 2017, is the artistic branch of the MiSK Foundation. MiSK led the Saudi pavilion at the 2019 Venice Biennale, organizing an exhibition by the Jeddah-based Saudi artist Zahrah Al Ghamdi. Saudi Codes  is an educational program that is implemented in partnership between Misk, the Saudi Ministry of Education and the Communication and Information Telecom Company (STC). MiSK Foundation launched in 2019 Growth Accelerator program to support tech start-ups in MENA region. In collaboration with the Saudi Ministry of Hajj, MiSk Foundation has launched Misk AL-Mashaer initiative that aims at recruiting volunteers to help pilgrims during Hajj season.

In November 2018, a month after the death of journalist Jamal Khashoggi, the Bill & Melinda Gates Foundation pulled funding from the foundation. The decision ended a joint initiative between the Gates Foundation and the MiSK Foundation called the MiSK Grand Challenges, which made grants to organisations around the world working to create innovative solutions to development challenges. In 2017, the Gates Foundation had committed $5 million to the MiSK Grant Challenges. “Jamal Khashoggi’s abduction and murder are extremely troubling,” said the Gates Foundation in a statement.

Entrepreneurship 
In the beginning of 2019, MISk foundation signed partnership contracts with 500 Startups to promote entrepreneurship. Misk Foundation started "Misk Startup School" for entrepreneurship education. In the same year, a group of young male and female Saudis represented the foundation in the Youth 20 Summit (Y20) held in Japan.

In April 2022, MiSK Foundation acquired 96% ownership of the Japanese video game company SNK.

See also 
 The Line, Saudi Arabia

 Jeddah Economic Forum
 Public Investment Fund
 World Economic Forum

External Link 
Official Website:

References

External links
 

Business organisations based in Saudi Arabia
Non-profit organisations based in Saudi Arabia
Organizations established in 2011
2011 establishments in Saudi Arabia